Leonardo Ricatti  (born 1 March 1970) is a former Argentine football midfielder who played for clubs in South America and Slovakia.

Club career
Ricatti played for Club Atlético San Lorenzo de Almagro in the Argentine Primera Division and ŠK Slovan Bratislava and Dukla Banská Bystrica in the Slovak Superliga

In 1996, Ricatti was involved in a strange incident when he went on trial with Avellino, then playing in Serie C. Club chairman, Antonio Sibilia, demanded that Ricatti cut his long hair within 24 hours or he would not be offered a contract.

References

1970 births
Living people
Sportspeople from Avellaneda
Argentine footballers
Argentine expatriate footballers
San Lorenzo de Almagro footballers
Santiago Wanderers footballers
ŠK Slovan Bratislava players
FK Dukla Banská Bystrica players
Slovak Super Liga players
Expatriate footballers in Chile
Expatriate footballers in Slovakia
Argentine expatriate sportspeople in Chile
Argentine expatriate sportspeople in Slovakia
Association football forwards